Escalaplano (or  ) is a comune (municipality) in the Province of South Sardinia in the Italian region Sardinia, located about  northeast of Cagliari.

Escalaplano borders the following municipalities: Ballao, Esterzili, Goni, Orroli, Perdasdefogu, Seui, Villaputzu.

References 

Cities and towns in Sardinia